Miroslovești is a commune in Iași County, Western Moldavia, Romania. It is composed of four villages: Miroslovești, Mitești, Soci and Verșeni. Ciohorăni was also part of Miroslovești until 2005, when it split away to form a separate commune.

References

Communes in Iași County
Localities in Western Moldavia